Delirium Tremens is the third of four albums by Mick Harvey, presenting the songs of Serge Gainsbourg, sung in English. It was preceded by Intoxicated Man in 1995 and Pink Elephants in 1997, and followed by Intoxicated Women in 2017.

Track listing
All tracks composed by Serge Gainsbourg, except: "I Envisage", written by Alain Bashung and Serge Gainsbourg; and "The Decadance", written by Addie Brik and Serge Gainsbourg
All lyrics translated by Mick Harvey.
"The Man With the Cabbage Head (L'Homme à tête de chou)" – 2:46
"Deadly Tedium (Ce Mortel Ennui)" – 2:46
"Coffee Colour (Couleur Café)" – 2:13
"The Convict's Song (Chanson du forçat)" – 3:43
"SS C'est Bon (Est-ce est-ce si bon?)" – 2:50
"I Envisage (J'envisage)" – 6:31
"A Day Like Any Other (Un jour comme un autre)" – 2:08
"A Violent Poison (That's What Love Is) (Un Poison Violent, C'est Ça L'Amour)" – 2:38
"More and More, Less and Less (De plus en plus, de moins en moins)" – 2:38
"Don't Say a Thing (Ne dis rien)" – 3:07
"Boomerang" – 3:09
"The Decadance (La décadanse)" – 5:35

Personnel 
(adapted from AllMusic entry)
Mick Harvey – design concept, cover photography, guitars, keyboards, collage layout, organ, piano, string arrangements, translation, vocals
Katy Beale –  vocals on "The Decadance"
Bertrand Burgalat – bass, piano, string arrangements
Hugo Cran - drums
Toby Dammit - bongos, drums, vibraphone
Glenn Lewis - bass
Jessica Ribeiro - backing vocals
Yoyo Röhm - guitar, piano
Julitha Ryan - backing vocals
Steve Shelley - shaker
J.P. Shilo - accordion, guitars, noise, organ, percussion, slide guitar, vocals, backing vocals
Lyndelle-Jayne Spruyt - translation assistant, backing vocals
Xanthe Waite - vocals on "A Day Like Any Other" and "Don't Say a Thing," backing vocals
Dahlia Adamopoulos, Vincent Catulescu, Biddy Connor, Pauline Hauswirth, Bronwyn Henderson, Anouk Ross, Lizzy Walsh - strings
Technical
Brenton Conlan, Ingo Krauss - engineer
David Mestre - French strings engineer 
Lindsay Gravina - mixing

External links
.

References

Mick Harvey albums
2016 albums
Mute Records albums
Serge Gainsbourg tribute albums